The vice-chancellor and warden is the chief executive officer of Durham University. The vice-chancellor also holds the position of "Warden of the Durham Colleges" and is appointed by Council. Reporting to the vice-chancellor and warden (and also members of the university executive committee) are the deputy vice-chancellor, pro-vice-chancellors for research, education and each of the faculties (Arts and Humanities, Science, and Social Science and Health), the pro-vice-chancellor and deputy warden of the colleges, the registrar (chief operating officer) and the treasurer (chief financial officer).

Under the original constitution of the university, the post of Warden combined the roles of chief executive and formal head of the university. Charles Thorp was appointed acting warden in December 1831 by Bishop William van Mildert, and in 1834 he was appointed to the position on a permanent basis by the dean and chapter of Durham Cathedral (who were then the governors of the university). After Thorp's death in 1862, the post of Warden was held ex officio by the Dean of Durham, with Sub-Warden (which had previously been rotated between the professors of the university) becoming a permanent post, presaging the vice-chancellorship.  From 1909, with the creation of the federal university,  and the handing over of the dean and chapter's responsibilities to the newly formed council, the executive and formal roles were officially separated into the vice-chancellor (executive head) and the chancellor (formal head), with the warden becoming the chancellor and the sub-warden becoming the vice-chancellor. The vice-chancellor was elected by the council to serve a two-year term. In 1937 the permanent posts of Warden of the Durham Colleges and Rector of King's College were created, with the vice-chancellorship being held by each for two years at a time.

With King's College becoming Newcastle University in 1963, the wardenship of the Durham Colleges was permanently united with the vice-chancellorship as the vice-chancellor and warden. The university numbered Chris Higgins as its 23rd vice-chancellor and warden, implying a count starting with the university's reconstitution in 1909 and continuing through the further reconstitutions in 1937 and 1963 despite the changes of title over this period.

The official residence of the vice-chancellor and warden is Hollingside House, formerly home to John Bacchus Dykes.

In May 2021, the University Council announced that Professor Karen O’Brien would become the university's first female vice-chancellor and warden, taking her post in January 2022. Antony Long, the deputy vice-chancellor and provost, served as interim vice-chancellor from August 2021 until January 2022.

Wardens of Durham University
Source: Durham University records.

 1831 – 1834 Charles Thorp (acting)
 1834 – 1862 Charles Thorp
 1862 – 1869 George Waddington
 1869 – 1894 William Lake
 1894 – 1909 George William Kitchin

Sub-wardens
Source: Fowler (1904) and Durham University records.

 1839 – 1840 Henry Jenkyns (Professor of Divinity)
 1840 – 1841 Temple Chevallier (Professor of Mathematics and Astronomy)
 1841 – 1842 Henry Jenkyns
 1842 – 1843 John Edwards (Professor of Greek and Classical Literature)
 1843 – 1844 Temple Chevallier
 1844 – 1845 Henry Jenkyns
 1845 – 1846 John Edwards
 1846 – 1847 Temple Chevallier
 1847 – 1848 Henry Jenkyns
 1848 – 1849 John Edwards
 1849 – 1850 Temple Chevallier
 1850 – 1851 Henry Jenkyns
 1851 – 1852 John Edwards
 1852 – 1853 Temple Chevallier
 1853 – 1854 Henry Jenkyns
 1854 – 1855 John Edwards
 1855 – 1856 Temple Chevallier
 1856 – 1857 Henry Jenkyns
 1857 – 1858 John Edwards
 1858 – 1859 Temple Chevallier
 1859 – 1860 Henry Jenkyns
 1860 – 1861 John Edwards
 1861 – 1871 Temple Chevallier
 1872 Thomas Saunders Evans
 1872 – 1880 Adam S. Farrar
 1880 – 1895 Robert J. Pearce
 1895 – 1902 Alfred Plummer
 1902 – 1909 Frank Byron Jevons

Vice Wardens 
Since 1967 the holders of the post of Vice Warden has been held in plurality with that of Pro-Vice-Chancellor.

Vice-chancellors
Source: Durham University records.

 1910 – 1912 Frank Byron Jevons (Master of Hatfield Hall)
 1912 – 1914 George Hare Philipson (President of the College of Medicine)
 1914 – 1916 Henry Gee (Master of University College)
 1916 – 1918 William Henry Hadow (Principal of Armstrong College)
 1918 – 1920 John Stapylton Grey Pemberton (President of the Council of Durham Colleges)
 1920 – 1922 David Drummond (President of the College of Medicine)
 1922 – 1924 Arthur Robinson (Master of Hatfield College)
 1924 – 1926 Theodore Morison (Principal of Armstrong College)
 1926 – 1928 Percy John Heawood (Professor of Mathematics)
 1928 – 1930 Thomas Oliver (President of the College of Medicine)
 1930 – 1932 Henry Ellershaw (Master of University College)
 1932 – 1934 William Sinclair Marris (Principal of Armstrong College)
 1934 – 1936 Stephen Moulsdale (Principal of St Chad's College)
 1936 – 1937 Robert Bolam (President of the College of Medicine)
 1937 – 1938 James Duff (Warden of the Durham Colleges 1937 – 1960)
 1939 – 1940 Eustace Percy (Rector of King's College 1937 – 1951)
 1941 – 1942 James Duff
 1943 – 1944 Eustace Percy
 1945 – 1946 James Duff
 1947 – 1948 Eustace Percy
 1949 – 1950 James Duff
 1951 Eustace Percy
 1952 Charles Bosanquet (Rector of King's College 1951 – 1963)
 1953 – 1954 James Duff
 1955 – 1956 Charles Bosanquet
 1957 – 1958 James Duff
 1959 – 1960 Charles Bosanquet
 1961 – 1963 Derman Christopherson (Warden of the Durham Colleges from 1960)

Vice-chancellors and wardens
Source: Durham University records except where otherwise noted.

 1963 – 1978: Sir Derman Christopherson
 1979: William K. R. Musgrave (acting)
 1980 – 1990: Frederick Holliday
 1990 – 1998: Evelyn Ebsworth
 1998 – 2007: Kenneth Calman
 2007 – 2014: Christopher Higgins
 2014 – 2015: Ray Hudson (acting)
 September 2015 – 2021: Stuart Corbridge
 2022 – present: Karen O'Brien

Pro-vice-chancellors 
Source: Durham University records.

The post of pro-vice-chancellor (PVC) was created, along with those of chancellor and vice-chancellor, by the Durham University Act 1908. The number of PVCs has varied over the years, from three over 1910–1937, dropping to one from 1937–1967 (held over 1937–1963 in rotation with the office of vice-chancellor), and rising since then to reach the current five in 2021. From 2004 to 2016 one of the PVCs was 'pro-vice-chancellor and deputy vice-chancellor'; from 2016 this became the 'deputy vice-chancellor and provost'. Since the mid 2010s, the PVCs have had responsibility for specific portfolios –  these are: education; research; colleges and student experience; global; and equality, diversity and inclusion, but have previously also included PVCs for each of the university's faculties.

 1910-1911 George Hare Philipson
 1910-1916 William Henry Hadow
 1910-1916 John Stapylton Grey Pemberton
 1912-1914 Frank Byron Jevons
 1914-1918 George Hare Philipson
 1916-1918 Henry Gee
 1916-1921 Frank Byron Jevons
 1918-1919 David Drummond
 1920-1923 Theodore Morison
 1920-1926 John Stapylton Grey Pemberton
 1922-1926 David Drummond
 1924-1930 Arthur Robinson
 1926-1930 Theodore Morison
 1927-1928 Robert Howden
 1928-1932 Percy John Heawood
 1930-1932 Thomas Oliver
 1930-1932 William Sinclair Marris
 1932-1936 Robert Alfred Bolam
 1932-1937 John Stapylton Grey Pemberton
 1932-1934 Stephen Richard Platt Moulsdale
 1934-1937 William Sinclair Marris
 1936-1937 Stephen Richard Platt Moulsdale
 1937-1939 Eustace Percy
 1939-1941 James Duff
 1941-1943 Eustace Percy
 1943-1945 James Duff
 1945-1947 Eustace Percy
 1947-1949 James Duff
 1949-1951 Eustace Percy
 1951-1953 James Duff
 1953-1955 Charles Bosanquet
 1955-1957 James Duff
 1957-1959 Charles Bosanquet
 1959-1960 James Duff
 1960-1961 Derman G. Christopherson
 1961-1962 Charles Bosanquet
 1962-1963 Walter A. Whitehouse
 1963-1969 Sidney Holgate (PVC and vice-warden from 1967)
 1967-1970 George Rochester
 1969-1973 Leonard Slater
 1970-1979 William K. R. Musgrave
 1973-1974 Mary Holdsworth
 1974-1982 James L. Brooks
 1979 George M. Brown
 1979-1984 Eric Sunderland
 1982-1985 Irene Hindmarsh
 1984-1990 John I. Clarke
 1985-1988 Edward C. Salthouse
 1987-1992 James P. Barber
 1988-1994 Graham E. Rodmell
 1991-1997 Peter D. B. Collins
 1992-1999 Michael Prestwich
 1994-2000 Barry S. Gower
 1997-2004 John Howard Anstee
 1999-2005 Joy Annette Palmer-Cooper
 2000-2006 Alan Bilsborough
 2004-2007 Philip Alan Jones
 2005-2008 James Stirling
 2007-2008 Gillian May Nicholls
 2007-2016 Ray Hudson
 2008-2014 Tom McLeish
 2008-2012 Anthony Forster
 2008-2015 Robin Coningham
 2012-2015 Tom Ward
 2011-2016 Graham Towl (and deputy warden of the colleges)
 2014-2018 Claire Warwick (education portfolio from 2017)
 2015-2019 Tim Clark (social sciences and health portfolio from 2017)
 2016-2019 Owen Adams (colleges and student experience)
 In 2017 Patrick Hussey (science)
 In 2017 David Cowling (arts and humanities)
 2017-2021 Alan Houston (education)
 2019–present Colin Bain (research)
 2018–present Claire O'Malley (global)
 2019–present Jeremy Cook (colleges and student experience)
 2021–present Shaid Mahmood (equality, diversity and inclusion)
 2021–present Tony Fawcett (education)

Pro-vice-chancellors and deputy vice-chancellors 

 2004-2007 Philip Alan Jones
 2011-2016 Ray Hudson

Deputy vice-chancellors and provosts 

 2016-2022 Antony Long
 2022–2023 Richard Crisp (acting); formerly Deputy Provost
 2023–present Mike Shipman

See also
 List of chancellors of Durham University
 Priors and wardens of Durham College, Oxford
 List of Durham University people
 History of Durham University

Notes

References

Durham University

Vice-Chancellors and Wardens
Durham